State Route 327 (SR 327) is a  north-south state highway that is located entirely in Franklin County in the northeast part of the U.S. state of Georgia.

Route description
SR 327 begins at an intersection with US 29/SR 8 (West Main Street) in the western part of Franklin Springs. It travels north-northeast, past Center Cemetery. It leaves the city limits of Franklin Springs and curves to the north-northwest, providing access to Victoria Bryant State Park and crossing over Rice Creek. Just before leaving the park, SR 327 curves back to the north-northeast and passes the Highland Walk Golf Course. Right before intersecting the northern terminus of Ken Norris Road, it curves to the north-northwest again and intersects SR 51 (Starr's Bridge Road). SR 327 curves again to the north-northeast and then curves to the northwest. Just past Airport Road, the highway curves again to the north-northeast. At the southern terminus of Unawatti Road, the highway curves to the east. SR 327 continues northeast until it meets its northern terminus, an intersection with SR 17 northwest of Bowersville. Here, the roadway continues as Hunnicutt Circle.

SR 327 is not part of the National Highway System, a system of roadways important to the nation's economy, defense, and mobility.

History

Major intersections

See also

References

External links

327
Transportation in Franklin County, Georgia